Philip Overholt is an electrical engineer at the United States Department of Energy in Washington, D.C. He was named a Fellow of the Institute of Electrical and Electronics Engineers (IEEE) in 2015 for his work in the development and deployment of synchrophasor technology.

References

20th-century births
Living people
American electrical engineers
Fellow Members of the IEEE
Year of birth missing (living people)
Place of birth missing (living people)